Christopher Nilsen (born January 13, 1998) is an American athlete specialising in pole vault and high jump.

High school
Nilsen graduated from Park Hill High School in Kansas City, Missouri. Nilsen was raised in hometown of Kansas City, Missouri.

Nilsen won 2016 Kansas Relays pole vault.

NCAA 
Nilsen attended the University of South Dakota.

Nilsen is a six-time NCAA Division I First Team All-American, and a three-time NCAA Track and field Pole vault champion. Nilsen holds South Dakota Coyotes school records in the Pole vault indoor  and outdoor .

Nilsen set American & NACAC outdoor pole vault U-20 record  and American & NACAC indoor pole vault U-20 record .

Nilsen honored as 2017 Summit League Indoor Field Athlete of the Year and 2017 Summit League Outdoor Field Athlete of the Year. Nilsen honored on The Bowerman Watch List throughout the 2017 outdoor season.

Nilsen won 2018 Texas Relays clearing , later battled Sam Kendricks at 2018 Drake Relays where he cleared  and described the competition in Des Moines, Iowa to Sioux City Journal.

Nilsen placed second at 2019 NCAA Division I Indoor Track and Field Championships and won the pole vault title in an NCAA Men's Division I Outdoor Track and Field Championships meet record at 2019 NCAA Division I Outdoor Track and Field Championships.

Nilsen won Summit League student-athlete of the week honors for the 9th time in 2019.

This jump represented an Indoor NCAA Collegiate record, previously held by LSU Freshman, Mondo Duplantis which stood until February 2021 KC Lightfoot cleared .

International
Nilsen began competing for South Dakota Coyotes and in Vermillion, South Dakota under coach Derek Miles in Fall 2016.

In London at 2017 World Championships in Athletics, Nilsen cleared  in the Pole Vault to place 13th.

Nilsen won gold in the pole vault at the 2019 Pan Am Games in Lima, Peru after clearing .

Nilsen began his professional career as a Nike sponsored athlete in July, 2020. He is currently working with his agent Karen Locke.

On June 21, 2021, Nilsen was the only pole vaulter to clear  at the 2020 Olympic Trials, cementing his first place win and getting him a spot on the Olympic team, alongside Sam Kendricks and KC Lightfoot. Nilsen was full of praise for the winner, Armand Duplantis. He compared the competition against Duplantis that evening as being a regular footballer "trying to emulate Lionel Messi or Cristiano Ronaldo" and that his superiority over the world's best pole vaulters was "impressive and ridiculous".

References

External links

 
 
 
 
 

1998 births
Living people
People from Kansas City, Missouri
Sportspeople from Missouri
Track and field athletes from Missouri
American male pole vaulters
South Dakota Coyotes track and field
Athletes (track and field) at the 2019 Pan American Games
Pan American Games gold medalists for the United States
Pan American Games medalists in athletics (track and field)
Pan American Games track and field athletes for the United States
Pan American Games gold medalists in athletics (track and field)
Medalists at the 2019 Pan American Games
South Dakota Coyotes athletes
USA Outdoor Track and Field Championships winners
Athletes (track and field) at the 2020 Summer Olympics
Medalists at the 2020 Summer Olympics
Olympic silver medalists for the United States in track and field
World Athletics Indoor Championships medalists
World Athletics Championships medalists